HMS Patroller was an escort carrier in the Royal Navy during the Second World War. Laid down in 1942 at the Seattle-Tacoma Shipbuilding company, she was originally named USS Keweenaw (CVE-44). USS Keweenaw (previously AVG-44 then later ACV-44) was an escort carrier laid down under Maritime Commission contract by Seattle-Tacoma Shipbuilding of Tacoma, Washington, 27 November 1942; launched 6 May 1943; sponsored by Mrs. R. G. Risley; assigned to the United Kingdom 10 June 1943; reclassified CVE-44 on 15 July 1943; and transferred to the United Kingdom under lend-lease 22 October 1943.

During the remainder of war, she served the Royal Navy as HMS Patroller and operated in the Atlantic on convoy escort and patrol duty, with brief stints as a transport carrier for both the Army and Navy.  Arriving Norfolk, Virginia, 9 December 1946, she was returned to the United States Navy the same day.  Her name was struck from the Naval Vessel Registry 7 February 1947 and she was sold to Waterman Steamship Corp., 26 August 1947 as Almkerk (later renamed Pacific Reliance).  She was scrapped in Taiwan in 1974.

Design and description
These ships were all larger and had a greater aircraft capacity than all the preceding American built escort carriers. They were also all laid down as escort carriers and not converted merchant ships.

Armament comprised: two 4"/50, 5"/38 or 5"/51 Dual Purpose guns in single mounts, sixteen 40 mm Bofors anti-aircraft guns in twin mounts and twenty 20 mm Oerlikon anti-aircraft cannons in single mounts. They had a maximum aircraft capacity of twenty-four aircraft which could be a mixture of Grumman Martlet, Vought F4U Corsair or Hawker Sea Hurricane fighter aircraft and Fairey Swordfish or Grumman Avenger anti-submarine aircraft.

Notes

References

External links
 Photo gallery at navsource.org

 

Ruler-class escort carriers
Ships built in Tacoma, Washington
1943 ships
World War II aircraft carriers of the United Kingdom